Lick is a surname. Notable people with the surname include:

 Dennis Lick (born 1954), American football player
 James Lick (1796–1876), American real estate investor, carpenter, piano builder, land baron, and patron of the sciences